Hammack is an unincorporated community in Macon County, in the U.S. state of Missouri.

History
A post office called Hammack was established in 1896, and remained in operation until 1904. The community was named after one Mr. Hammack, the proprietor of a nearby mill.

References

Unincorporated communities in Macon County, Missouri
Unincorporated communities in Missouri